Light-City Buses was an Australian bus service operator in Adelaide. It operated services as part of the Adelaide Metro network under contract to the Government of South Australia. It was a subsidiary of Broadspectrum, formerly known as Transfield Services. In June 2018, the business was purchased by Torrens Transit.

History

In October 2011 Light-City Buses commenced operating the Adelaide Metro North-South and Outer North East region services under contract to the Government of South Australia. The two contract regions covered 43% of the bus services in Adelaide.

The contracts were to run for an initial eight-year term, from 2 October 2011 to 30 June 2019 with an optional four-year extension exercisable if performance criteria were met. Transfield Services had previously unsuccessfully tendered to operate buses in Adelaide in 2004 in a joint venture with Transdev. The two contracts had been operated by Torrens Transit since April 2005 and between 2000 and 2005 by Serco.

In April 2013, Light-City Buses was stripped of eight routes for continued poor performance.

In June 2018, Torrens Transit acquired the business, including 370 buses and 700 employees.

Fleet
As at April 2018, the fleet consisted of 366 buses. Buses were painted in Adelaide Metro livery.

Depots
Light–City Buses operated three depots in Morphettville, St Agnes and Wingfield.

References

External links
Adelaide Metro
Broadspectrum
Adelaide Metro Contract Area Map (as of December 2013)

Broadspectrum
Bus companies of South Australia
Transport in Adelaide
Transport companies established in 2011
Transport companies disestablished in 2018
2011 establishments in Australia
Defunct bus companies of Australia
Australian companies disestablished in 2018

ja:アデレード・メトロ
pt:Metropolitano de Adelaide